The Inginimitiya Dam is an embankment dam built across the Mi Oya, at Inginimitiya, Sri Lanka.

Reservoir 
The reservoir facilitates supply of water to 6539 acres land for agriculture, including new land area of about 4600 acres. The idea for making reservoir in Inginimitiya has been proposed for the first time in Rajya manthrana sabha before 75 years ago in 1930s. But the construction of reservoir was commenced on 14 March 1981 and declared opened on 25 March 1985 by then Sri Lanka President J. R. Jayawardene. Overall project scheme was funded as loan aids by Japan and it is Yen 1800 Millions. Apart this Sri Lanka government has been received Rupees 89,000,000 as local funds.

See also 
 List of dams and reservoirs in Sri Lanka

References

External links 
 

Dams in Sri Lanka
Buildings and structures in Puttalam District
Earth-filled dams
Dams completed in 1985
Buildings and structures in North Western Province, Sri Lanka